Stare Wierzchowo  is a village in the administrative district of Gmina Szczecinek, within Szczecinek County, West Pomeranian Voivodeship, in north-western Poland.

The village has an approximate population of 140.

References

Stare Wierzchowo